Mark Walter Landsberger (born May 21, 1955) is a retired American professional basketball player. At 6'8" and 215 pounds, he played power forward and center for the Los Angeles Lakers from 1980-1983.

Career
Landsberger attended Mounds View High School (Arden Hills, Minnesota) where he graduated in 1973 after leading the Mustangs to the 1972 AA State Championship as a junior.  In his senior campaign, he averaged 26.1 points per game, and led the Mustangs back to the state tournament and the consolation championship. Over his high school varsity career, he scored 1,290 points and grabbed 910 rebounds.

Landsberger then attended Allan Hancock College, where he was the California junior college player of the year, the University of Minnesota, and Arizona State University. At ASU, he set school records for most rebounds in a game (27) and highest rebounds-per game average in a season (14.4). After college, he was selected by the Chicago Bulls in the second round of the 1977 NBA Draft.  He appeared in 196 games for the Bulls from 1977 to 1980, averaging 7.4 points per game and 7.6 rebounds per game.  On January 28, 1979, Landsberger grabbed 29 rebounds in a game against the Denver Nuggets.  At the time, this was the third-highest single-game rebounding total in Chicago Bulls history. That season, Landsberger ranked seventh in the league in total offensive rebounds, with 292.

On February 13, 1980, the Bulls traded Landsberger to the Los Angeles Lakers in exchange for Oliver Mack and two second round draft choices. Landsberger remained in Los Angeles until 1983.  Playing behind future hall-of-famers like Kareem Abdul-Jabbar, James Worthy, and Magic Johnson, he averaged 4.7 points per game and 5.2 rebounds per game with the Lakers. He won NBA Championship rings as a reserve in 1980 and 1982.

Landsberger started the 1983-84 NBA season with the Lakers but was waived later that year before given any playing time. He signed with the Atlanta Hawks on December 29, 1983, where he averaged 1.5 points and 3.4 rebounds in 35 games to finish the season. This was his last season in the NBA, and he ended his NBA career with 2,468 total points and 2,681 total rebounds.  He played professionally in Europe until the 1990s. Among the highlights of his European career was a 34 rebound game while playing for Lotus Montecatini Terme in Lucca/Italy on November 11, 1990. That performance set a record for most rebounds in an Italian league game. Landsberger also set Greek league records for most rebounds in a game (31) and highest rebounds per game average for a season (17.9).

On June 21st 2021, it was announced by Deadline that Landsberger will be portrayed by actor Austin Aaron in the upcoming HBO series Winning Time. The series is set to premiere in March 2022.

References

External links

Lega Basket Serie A profile Retrieved 15 June 2015 

1955 births
Living people
Allan Hancock Bulldogs men's basketball players
American expatriate basketball people in Argentina
American expatriate basketball people in Greece
American expatriate basketball people in Italy
American expatriate basketball people in Spain
American men's basketball players
Arizona State Sun Devils men's basketball players
Atlanta Hawks players
Basketball players from North Dakota
Centers (basketball)
Chicago Bulls draft picks
Chicago Bulls players
Fulgor Libertas Forlì players
Gimnasia y Esgrima de Comodoro Rivadavia basketball players
Lega Basket Serie A players
Liga ACB players
Los Angeles Lakers players
Minnesota Golden Gophers men's basketball players
Montecatiniterme Basketball players
Panionios B.C. players
Power forwards (basketball)
Sportspeople from Minot, North Dakota